"Uncle Tom's Cabin" is a song by American glam metal band Warrant. It was released in April 1991 as the third single from Warrant's second album Cherry Pie. The song charted at #78 on the Billboard Hot 100 and #19 on the Mainstream Rock Tracks chart.  In Australia, the single peaked at #85 on the ARIA singles chart in May 1991.

A music video was made for the song, and later the song was re-visited by the band in 1999 on their Greatest & Latest album.

Background

According to frontman Jani Lane, the original working title for the song was "I Know a Secret".

Prior to the writing of the song "Cherry Pie", the album's title and first single was to have been "Uncle Tom's Cabin", a track which foreshadowed the kind of imaginative song writing which would later be more fully revealed on the Dog Eat Dog record. Although named after the classic novel by Harriet Beecher Stowe, the song tells the story of a witness to the involvement of local police in a double murder.

Track listing

Charts

References

1990 songs
1991 singles
Songs written by Jani Lane
Warrant (American band) songs
Columbia Records singles
Murder ballads